The Circle was a historic restaurant building located at Portsmouth, Virginia designed by Dorothy Pebworth. It was built in 1947, and was a one-story, Moderne style building.  It was a stuccoed concrete block structure with a prominent half-circle building mass marking the façade. The half-circle was surmounted by a neon-lit sign with the restaurant's name. The bar had a mural attributed to Al Hirschfeld of mid-20th century celebrities.  The Circle was an original curb-service restaurant, which later served as a dine-in restaurant.  The building was demolished on August 19, 2013.

It was listed on the National Register of Historic Places in 2006, and was removed from the National Register in 2017.

References

External links
"Portsmouth's Circle Restaurant to be sold or torn down," By Cherise M. Newsome, The Virginian-Pilot, March 5, 2013

Commercial buildings on the National Register of Historic Places in Virginia
Commercial buildings completed in 1947
Moderne architecture in Virginia
Buildings and structures in Portsmouth, Virginia
National Register of Historic Places in Portsmouth, Virginia
Former National Register of Historic Places in Virginia